Jefimija (1349–1405), secular name Jelena Mrnjavčević (Serbian Cyrillic: Јелена Мрњавчевић,  or ), daughter of Vojihna and widow of Jovan Uglješa Mrnjavčević, is considered the first female Serbian poet. Her Lament for a Dead Son and Encomium of Prince Lazar are famous in the canon of medieval Serbian literature.

Encomium of Prince Lazar

Legacy
She is included in The 100 most prominent Serbs.

See also
 Maria Angelina Doukaina Palaiologina
 Princess Milica of Serbia
 Saint Angelina of Serbia
 Mara Branković
 Olivera Despina
 Jelena Balšić
 Helen of Anjou
 Simonida
 Katarina Branković

References

Sources

Further reading

1349 births
1405 deaths
14th-century Serbian nuns
15th-century Serbian nuns
14th-century poets
15th-century poets
14th-century women writers
15th-century women writers
Medieval Serbian poets
Medieval Serbian princesses
Serbian epic poetry
Serbian women poets
14th-century Serbian writers
15th-century Serbian writers